Why Call It Anything is the fourth and final album of original material and fifth studio album overall by English rock band the Chameleons. It was recorded from 2000 to 2001 and released 1 July 2001 on record label Artful. The album marked their first and only release of all-new material since the 1990 EP Tony Fletcher Walked on Water.... La La La La La-La La-La-La.

Background 
Why Call It Anything was recorded from September 2000 to May 2001 at Chapel Studios, Arc Studios and Woodbine Studios.

Critical reception 
The Encyclopedia of Popular Music wrote, "Why Call It Anything proved to be a stunning reaffirmation of the brilliance of this unsung band".

Track listing

Personnel 
 The Chameleons

 Mark Burgess – vocals, bass guitar, production
 Dave Fielding – guitar, keyboard, backing vocals, production
 John Lever – drums, backing vocals, production
 Reg Smithies – guitar, backing vocals, production

 Additional personnel

 Kwasi Asante – additional vocals, additional percussion

 Technical

 David M. Allen – production, engineering, mixing
 John Rivers – engineering, mixing, mastering
 Ewan Davies – engineering

References

External links 

 

2001 albums
The Chameleons albums
Albums produced by David M. Allen